The Saqqara Aramaic Stele is an Egyptian-Aramaic stele found in Saqqara in 1877.

The Aramaic inscription is known as KAI 267, CIS II 122 and TAD C20.3.

It was held in the Neues Museum in Berlin which was destroyed in World War II.

References

Aramaic inscriptions